Tunisia competed at the 2012 Summer Olympics in London, from 27 July to 12 August 2012. This was the nation's thirteenth appearance at the Olympics, having missed the 1980 Summer Olympics in Moscow because of its partial support for the United States boycott.

The Tunisian Olympic Committee (CNOT) sent the nation's largest delegation to the Games, surpassing the number of athletes sent to Beijing by almost two thirds. A total of 83 athletes, 63 men and 20 women, competed in 17 sports. Men's basketball, men's handball, and men's indoor volleyball were the only team-based sports in which Tunisia was represented at these Olympic Games. There was only a single competitor in artistic gymnastics, sailing, shooting, and taekwondo.

Notable Tunisian athletes included freestyle swimmer and defending champion Oussama Mellouli, who competed at his fourth Olympics, tennis player and former Youth Olympic games participant Ons Jabeur, and fencing sisters Azza and Sarra Besbes. Heykel Megannem, captain of Tunisia's handball team, made his Olympic comeback in London after a twelve-year absence and was the nation's flag bearer at the opening ceremony.

Tunisia left London with three medals, which were all awarded to the team in athletics and swimming. This was the nation's most successful Olympics, winning the largest number of medals in its history, sending its largest delegation ever to the games due to the presence of team-based athletes, and making Olympic history for two legendary athletes. Middle-distance runner Habiba Ghribi became the first Tunisian female athlete to win an Olympic medal in the women's steeplechase. Meanwhile, Oussama Mellouli became the first Olympic swimming champion at both pool and open water, and became most successful Tunisian athlete in Olympic history with two gold medals.

Medalists

| width="78%" align="left" valign="top" |

Athletics

Tunisian athletes have so far achieved qualifying standards in the following athletics events (up to a maximum of 3 athletes in each event at the 'A' Standard, and 1 at the 'B' Standard):

Men

Women

Basketball

Tunisia is qualified for the men's event
 Men's team event – 1 team of 12 players

Men's tournament

Roster

Group play

Boxing

Tunisia has so far qualified boxers for the following events

Men

Women

Canoeing

Sprint
Tunisia has qualified boats for the following events

Qualification Legend: FA = Qualify to final (medal); FB = Qualify to final B (non-medal)

Fencing

Tunisia has qualified 6 fencers.

Men

Women

Gymnastics

Tunisia has qualified in the following events.

Artistic
Men

Handball

Tunisia will participate to the Olympic Games as the defending Africa Champion.
 Men's team event – 1 team of 14 players

Men's tournament

Group play

Quarter-final

Judo

Tunisia has qualified 4 judokas

Rowing

Tunisia has qualified the following boats.

Men

Women

Qualification Legend: FA=Final A (medal); FB=Final B (non-medal); FC=Final C (non-medal); FD=Final D (non-medal); FE=Final E (non-medal); FF=Final F (non-medal); SA/B=Semifinals A/B; SC/D=Semifinals C/D; SE/F=Semifinals E/F; QF=Quarterfinals; R=Repechage

Sailing

Tunisia has qualified 1 boat for each of the following events

Men

M = Medal race; EL = Eliminated – did not advance into the medal race;

Shooting

Tunisia has qualified one shooter.

Women

Swimming

Tunisian swimmers have so far achieved qualifying standards in the following events (up to a maximum of 2 swimmers in each event at the Olympic Qualifying Time (OQT), and potentially 1 at the Olympic Selection Time (OST)):

Men

Women

Taekwondo

Tunisia has qualified 1 athlete.

Tennis

Volleyball

Tunisia has qualified a men's team to the indoor tournament.
 Men's team event – 1 team of 12 players

Men's indoor tournament

Team roster

Group play

Weightlifting

Tunisia has qualified 1 man and 1 woman.

Wrestling

Tunisia has qualified 8 quota places.

Men's freestyle

Men's Greco-Roman

Women's freestyle

References

External links

Nations at the 2012 Summer Olympics
2012
2012 in Tunisian sport